Feredayia is a genus of moths of the family Noctuidae.

Selected Species
Feredayia graminosa (Walker, 1857)

References
Natural History Museum Lepidoptera genus database

Hadeninae